Paul Edward Strand (December 19, 1893 – July 2, 1974) was an American professional baseball pitcher and outfielder. He played in Major League Baseball (MLB) for the Boston Braves and Philadelphia Athletics. Strand has held the record for the most hits by one player in a professional season since he accumulated 325 for the Salt Lake City Bees of the Pacific Coast League during the 1923 season.

References

External links

1893 births
1974 deaths
Major League Baseball pitchers
Major League Baseball outfielders
Boston Braves players
Philadelphia Athletics players
Baseball players from Washington (state)
Spokane Indians players
Walla Walla Bears players
Toledo Iron Men players
Seattle Giants players
Joplin Miners players
Peoria Tractors players
Yakima Indians players
Seattle Rainiers players
Salt Lake City Bees players
Toledo Mud Hens players
Columbus Senators players
Portland Beavers players
Atlanta Crackers players
Little Rock Travelers players